The 1987 East Northamptonshire District Council election took place on 7 May 1987 to elect members of East Northamptonshire District Council in Northamptonshire, England. This was on the same day as other local elections. The Conservative Party retained overall control of the council which it had held since the council's creation in 1973.

Ward-by-Ward Results

Barnwell Ward (1 seat)

Brigstock Ward (1 seat)

Drayton Ward (1 seat)

Forest Ward (1 seat)

Higham Ferriers Ward (3 seats)

Irthlingborough Ward (3 seats)

Kings Cliffe Ward (1 seat)

Lower Nene Ward (1 seat)

Margaret Beaufort Ward (1 seat)

Oundle Ward (2 seats)

Raunds Ward (3 seats)

Ringstead Ward (1 seat)

Rushden East Ward (3 seats)

Rushden North Ward (3 seats)

Rushden South Ward (3 seats)

Rushden West Ward (3 seats)

Stanwick Ward (1 seat)

Thrapston Ward (2 seats)

Willibrook Ward (1 seat)

Woodford Ward (1 seat)

References

1987 English local elections
1987
1980s in Northamptonshire